Ban Haet station is a railway station located in Ban Haet Subdistrict, Ban Haet District, Khon Kaen Province. The station was rebuilt in 2019 as part of the double tracking project between Thanon Chira Junction and Khon Kaen.

References 

Railway stations in Thailand
Khon Kaen province